Robinson Ekspeditionen 2004, was the seventh season of the Danish version of the Swedish show Expedition Robinson. This season premiered on August 30, 2004, and aired until December 1, 2004. This season was the first to be hosted by the show's current host, Jakob Kjeldbjerg. This season began with a series of twist, the first being that two contestants would be eliminated through a challenge on day one. Pia "Bonnet" Trussel lost the challenge and chose Karabi Bergman to be eliminated with her. Following the initial elimination it was revealed to the teams that within both of the teams were two people who were related to each other; on the North team these two were Duddie and Mass Staack, a mother and son and on the South team these two were Jens and Stine Wedel, a married couple. Along with this, this season saw the show's first ever pregnant contestant, Natasja Hansen. Shortly before the merge, a tribal swap occurred that saw Brian Rosenkilde and Tine Petterssen switching tribes. When it came time for the final four competition all of the eliminated contestants competed to earn a spot in the final four. The winner of the fourth and final spot was Bjarke Møller, who initially was eliminated in a duel against Morten Fredericia. Ultimately, it was Mette Frandsen who won the season over Tine Petterssen and Duddie Staack by a jury vote of 3-3-2 after having answered a question correctly to break the tie.

Finishing order

External links
http://www.bt.dk/underholdning/snuppet-i-snyd-0
http://www.bonettsverden.dk/21796608

Robinson Ekspeditionen seasons
Danish reality television series
2004 Danish television seasons